The Mülheim Bridge in Cologne is a suspension bridge on the river Rhine in western Germany. It has a main span of 315 metres. The bridge was originally completed in 1929. On October 14–15, 1944, an American bomb struck the chamber containing the demolition charges, destroying the bridge.  The bridge was rebuilt between 1949 and 1951. It connects the city district Riehl on the west side of the river with Mülheim on the east side, after which the bridge is named.

References

See also 
 List of bridges in Germany

Buildings and structures in Cologne
Mülheim, Cologne
Suspension bridges in Germany
Road bridges in Germany
Bridges over the Rhine
Bridges completed in 1951
Bridges in North Rhine-Westphalia